Waldir Alejandro Sáenz Pérez (born May 15, 1973, in Lima) is a Peruvian retired football striker.

Career
Waldir is most famous as a player for Alianza Lima, in which he became the all-time leading goalscorer of the club with 167 goals in 324 matches. He also played for Colorado Rapids (1998), Unión de Santa Fe (1999), Sporting Cristal (2000), among others. In 2013, he came back from retirement to play for Walter Ormeño.

International career
He obtained 27 caps for the Peru national football team from 1993 to 2000, scoring three goals.

References

External links

Waldir Saenz's Goals

1973 births
Living people
Footballers from Lima
Association football forwards
Peruvian footballers
Peru international footballers
Peruvian Primera División players
Argentine Primera División players
Major League Soccer players
Club Alianza Lima footballers
Colorado Rapids players
Unión de Santa Fe footballers
Sporting Cristal footballers
FBC Melgar footballers
Deportivo Municipal footballers
Sport Boys footballers
Peruvian expatriate footballers
Expatriate footballers in Argentina
Expatriate soccer players in the United States
1993 Copa América players
1997 Copa América players
2000 CONCACAF Gold Cup players